Guy Henry may refer to:
Guy Vernor Henry (1839–1899), military officer and Governor of Puerto Rico
Guy Henry (equestrian) (1875–1967), American Olympic equestrian
Guy Henry (actor) (born 1960), British stage and screen actor

See also
 Henry Guy (disambiguation)